"Second Fiddle (To an Old Guitar)" is a single by American country music artist Jean Shepard.  Released in April 1964, it was later released on the 1966 album, Heart, We Did All We Could. The songs describes a lover who feels neglected after her partner is more interested in his guitar than her, which makes her feel like a second fiddle in comparison. The song reached #5 on the Billboard Hot Country Singles chart.

Chart performance

References

1964 singles
Jean Shepard songs
Song recordings produced by Ken Nelson (American record producer)
1964 songs
Capitol Records singles